Athene Seyler, CBE (31 May 188912 September 1990) was an English actress.

Early life 
She was born in Hackney, London; her German-born grandparents moved to the United Kingdom, where her grandfather Philip Seyler was a merchant in London. Athene Seyler was educated at Coombe Hill School in Surrey, a progressive co-educational school which disliked petitionary prayer and whose advanced biology classes studied Darwin's On the Origin of Species. Seyler took part in an anti-blood sports demonstration, during which pupils captured the fox from the local hunt.

She was also active in the South Place Ethical Society during the 1920s, where her father Clarence H. Seyler took his family for many years to hear Moncure Conway lecture as an alternative to attending a religious Sunday service. Clarence ran a class for the study of Herbert Spencer, contributed to the South Place magazine on rationalist matters and wrote a treatise on birth control which he circulated privately among his family.

Career

Seyler first appeared on the stage in 1909, and was initially  known as a stage actress. She made her film debut in 1921, and subsequently became known for playing slightly dotty old ladies in many British films from the 1930s to the 1960s.

In 1933, Seyler together with Nicholas Hannen, took a company which included Hannen's daughter by his first marriage, Hermione Hannen, on a well-received tour of the Far East and Australia.

Her most memorable stage credits included Mrs Malaprop in The Rivals, Lady Bracknell in The Importance of Being Earnest and a double-act, with her good friend Dame Sybil Thorndike, as the murderous spinster sisters in Arsenic and Old Lace.

Her film and television career lasted into the 1960s, and included roles in The Citadel (1938), Night of the Demon (1957) and The Avengers (1964, 1965). She was also a regular cast member in screen adaptations of Charles Dickens' novels. Although her silent film appearance in Pickwick (1921) is missing, she played the elderly fiancée in The Pickwick Papers (1952). She was cast as a Chinese woman in Passport to China (1960).

Seyler virtually retired from acting after 1970 but continued making public appearances until well into the 1980s, memorably as a guest of Terry Wogan on his eponymous BBC chat show. In 1988, at the age of 99, she was the castaway on radio's Desert Island Discs. In 1990, at the age of 101, she appeared at the National Theatre, talking about her long life and career.

Athene Seyler was President of the Royal Academy of Dramatic Art (RADA) from 1950, and a member of the Theatrical Ladies' Guild. She also wrote The Craft of Comedy.

Honours and awards
She was appointed a Commander of the Order of the British Empire (CBE) in 1959. In 1989 she was honoured as "Personality of the Century" by the Grand Order of Water Rats.

Marriages and relationships

On 14 February 1914 she married James Bury Sterndale-Bennett (1889–1941), a grandson of the composer Sir William Sterndale Bennett and had a daughter with him, Jane Ann (1917–2015).

In 1922, she met and started living with fellow actor Nicholas "Beau" Hannen, son of Sir Nicholas Hannen. Hannen was married and his wife refused a divorce. In 1928, Seyler formally changed her name to Athene Hannen, although she continued to use Seyler professionally. In 1960, she and Hannen were married after his wife died. At the age of ninety, Seyler told the interviewer David McGillivray that "she hadn't been made a Dame because for most of her life she lived with a man who wasn't her husband."

Portraits

The British National Portrait Gallery has numerous photos of Seyler.

The Australian National Portrait Gallery website has a portrait of Hannen and Seyler together.

Death

Athene Seyler died in 1990, aged 101, and her ashes were placed in the Hannen Columbarium in St Mary's Churchyard, Wargrave.

Selected stage performances 

 Harvey
 Watch on the Rhine
 Lady Windermere's Fan
 Mavourneen by Louis N. Parker (1915)
 The Iron Duchess by William Douglas Home (1957)
 The Rivals
 Romeo and Juliet
 The Cherry Orchard
 Arsenic and Old Lace

Filmography 

 The Adventures of Mr. Pickwick (1921) - Rachel Wardle
 This Freedom (1923) - Miss Keggs
 The Perfect Lady (1931) - Lady Westhaven
 Tell Me Tonight (1932) - Mrs. Pategg
 Early to Bed (1933) - Frau Weiser
 Blossom Time (1934) - Archduchess Maria Victoria
 The Private Life of Don Juan (1934) - Theresa, the Innkeeper, a Middle Aged Lady of Young Sentiment
 The Rocks of Valpre (1935) - Aunt Philippa
 Royal Cavalcade (1935) - Queen Elizabeth I
 Drake of England (1935) - Queen Elizabeth
 Moscow Nights (1935) - Madame Anna Sabline
 Scrooge (1935) - Scrooge's charwoman
 It's Love Again (1936) - Mrs. Durland
 Southern Roses (1936) - Mrs. Rowland
 Irish for Luck (1936) - The Duchess
 Sensation (1936) - Madame Henry
 The Mill on the Floss (1937) - Mrs. Pullet (uncredited)
 The Lilac Domino (1937) - Madame Alary
 Non-Stop New York (1937) - Aunt Veronica
 Sailing Along (1938) - Victoria Gulliver
 Jane Steps Out (1938) - Grandma
 The Citadel (1938) - Lady Raebank
 The Ware Case (1938) - Mrs. Pinto
 The Sky's the Limit (1938) - Miss Prinney
 The Saint in London (1939) - Mrs. Buckley
 Young Man's Fancy (1939) - Milliner
 Tilly of Bloomsbury (1940) - Mrs. Banks
 The House of the Arrow (1940) - (uncredited)
 Quiet Wedding (1941) - Aunt Mary
 Dear Octopus (1943) - Aunt Belle
 The Life and Adventures of Nicholas Nickleby (1947) - Miss La Creevy
 The First Gentleman (1948) - Miss Knight
 The Queen of Spades (1949) - Princess Ivashin
 The Franchise Affair (1951) - Aunt Lin
 Young Wives' Tale (1951) - Nanny Gallop
 Secret People (1952) - Mrs. Reginald Kellick
 Treasure Hunt (1952) - Consuelo Howard
 Made in Heaven (1952) - Miss Rosabelle Honeycroft
 The Pickwick Papers (1952) - Miss Witherfield
 The Beggar's Opera (1953) - Mrs. Trapes
 The Weak and the Wicked (1954) - Millie Williams, inmate
 For Better, for Worse (1954) - Miss Mainbrace
 As Long as They're Happy (1955) - Mrs. Arbuthnot
 Yield to the Night (1956) - Miss Bligh
 Doctor at Large (1957) - Lady Hawkins
 How to Murder a Rich Uncle (1957) - Grannie
 Campbell's Kingdom (1957) - Miss Abigail
 Night of the Demon (1957) - Mrs. Karswell
 A Tale of Two Cities (1958) - Miss Emily Pross
 Happy Is the Bride (1958) - Aunt Harriet
 The Inn of the Sixth Happiness (1958) - Jeannie Lawson
 Make Mine Mink (1960) - Dame Beatrice Appleby DBE
 A French Mistress (1960) - Beatrice Peake
 Visa to Canton (1961) - Mao Tai Tai
 Francis of Assisi (1961) - Aunt Buona
 The Devil Never Sleeps (1962) - Sister Agness
 Two and Two Make Six (1962) - Aunt Phoebe Tonks
 I Thank a Fool (1962) - Aunt Heather
 The Girl on the Boat (1962) - Mrs. Adelaide Hignett
 Nurse on Wheels (1963) - Miss Farthingale

Selected television and radio performances 
 The Avengers episode entitled "Maneater of Surrey Green" ITV Production 1965
 The Iron Duchess by William Douglas-Home, BBC radio, broadcast 1966
 The Reluctant Peer by William Douglas-Home, BBC radio, broadcast 1967

Publications 

 with Stephen Haggard The Craft of Comedy (1944), reprinted by Routledge, 2012

See also
 List of centenarians (actors, filmmakers and entertainers)

References

External links
 
  Stage performances listed in the Theatre Archive University of Bristol
 Athen Seyler and Nicholas Hannen in 1964 at Buckingham Palace garden party

1889 births
1990 deaths
Alumni of RADA
Commanders of the Order of the British Empire
English centenarians
English film actresses
English stage actresses
English television actresses
20th-century English actresses
People from Hackney Central
Women centenarians
20th-century British businesspeople